Sendai Television Inc. (株式会社仙台放送, OX) is a TV station affiliated with Fuji News Network (FNN) and Fuji Network System (FNS) serving in Miyagi Prefecture, Japan, headquartered in Sendai. It was established on October 1, 1962.

TV channel
 Sendai
Analog: JOOX-TV, Channel 12, VIDEO:10 kW AUDIO:2.5 kW (Wave stopped on March 31, 2012)
Digital: JOOX-DTV, Channel 21, 3 kW

Programs

Anime

External links
 The official website of Sendai Television

1962 establishments in Japan
Fuji News Network
Mass media in Sendai
Television stations in Japan
Television channels and stations established in 1962
Companies based in Sendai